Moyie Falls el. , Boundary County, Idaho, is an  waterfall on the Moyie River Crashing through a rocky canyon, the Moyie River descends in tiered form.  While the upper portion plummets 60 to 100 feet under an obsolete bridge connecting the gorge, the lower portion tumbles 20 to 40 feet.

See also

 List of waterfalls in Idaho

Notes

Landforms of Boundary County, Idaho
Waterfalls of Idaho
Tourist attractions in Boundary County, Idaho
Tiered waterfalls